Central Bangna, also known as Central City Bangna (previously known as CentralPlaza Bangna) is a shopping centre on Bang Na–Trat Road located in Bang Na District in Bangkok, Thailand.

History
The shopping mall was developed with joint investment of Central Pattana, Srivikorn Group, Navabhand Group and Tosapol Management Co., Ltd in December 1993. Later in December 2001, Central Pattana acquired the shopping mall and then renovated it including numerous exterior and interior improvements, new zoning and the development of innovative retail spaces.

Facilities
The mall has a total 6 floors with two basement floors.

Anchors 
 Central Department Store
 Power Buy
 Supersports
 B2S Think Space
 Major Cineplex 11 Cinemas
 Tops Food Hall
 Food Patio
 Bangna Hall
 Big C Bangna (Next to Shopping Mall)

Waterpark 
The waterpark at CentralPlaza Bangna first opened as Leo Land Waterpark, located on the sixth floor of the department store. It was closed for a major renovation in 2014. On 18 February 2016, the waterpark was reopened as "Pororo AquaPark Bangkok", designed under the theme of Pororo the Little Penguin. It was the second Pororo Aquapark after the first opened in Singapore in 2015.

Central City Tower 
Central City Tower was a 37 floors office building located besides the CentralPlaza Bangna department store. Central Pattana was acquired the tower together with the department store in 2001. The tower's major tenant were tutors, language school, health care & beauty parlour and clinic.

See also
 List of shopping malls in Thailand

External links 
 Central Group website

Notes

References 
 
 

Shopping malls in Bangkok
Central Pattana
Bang Na district
Shopping malls established in 1993
1993 establishments in Thailand